The Vostochny Cosmodrome ("Eastern Spaceport") is a Russian spaceport (still partly under construction) above the 51st parallel north in the Amur Oblast, in the Russian Far East. It is intended to reduce Russia's dependency on the Baikonur Cosmodrome in Kazakhstan. The first launch took place on 28 April 2016 at 02:01 UTC. As of 1 July 2022, eleven launch attempts have been made with ten successes.

Location 
The nearby train station is Ledyanaya and the nearest city is Tsiolkovsky. 

The latitude means that rockets will be able to carry almost the same amount of payload as they can when launched from Baikonur at 46° N, as lower latitudes need less expended orbital energy. Other positives include the ability to use sparsely populated areas and bodies of water for the rocket launch routes; proximity to major transportation networks such as the Baikal–Amur Mainline and the Chita–Khabarovsk Highway; abundant local electricity production (for the hydrogen rocket fuel electrolysis and liquefaction); and the infrastructure supporting the former Svobodny Cosmodrome, the local prototype. 

The location has a quite speedy supply of most materials and allows rockets to jettison their lower stages over the ocean. It was expanded as part of a plan to modernize the supporting infrastructure. Russian president Vladimir Putin confirmed that other places proffered were on the shore of the Pacific, near Vladivostok, which experts have disfavoured for their oceanic climate, liable to cause delays in date-sensitive launches.

History 

Russian president Vladimir Putin made several statements emphasizing the importance of the new cosmodrome. In August 2010 he said, "The creation of a new space center... is one of modern Russia's biggest and most ambitious projects". In January 2011, he ordered the government to complete the paperwork as soon as possible so that construction can start on schedule. The general designer of the cosmodrome is Ipromashprom (Mechanical Engineering Project Institute). The main contractor is the Federal Agency for Special Construction.

Construction of the cosmodrome began in January 2011 and was expected to be completed in 2018. During a visit to the site in July 2011, the newly appointed chief of Roscosmos, Vladimir Popovkin, promised 20 billion rubles for Vostochny during 2012. A month later the head of Spetstroy, Grigory Naginsky, told the press that the first blueprints for the center went through the project expertise and the first contract worth 1.6 billion rubles was signed with Roscosmos, covering construction of a railway line and a road. Naginsky also promised completion of the initial makeshift housing for construction workers at the site by 1 October 2011.

Although the Angara pad at Vostochny had originally been planned for completion in 2018, as part of the second phase of construction of the new launch center, Dmitry Rogozin announced in January 2013 that the Angara would fly from Vostochny earlier, in 2015. However, Roscosmos announced in November 2014 a postponement, saying that the first unmanned test mission of Angara would not launch until 2021.

Over 100 construction workers went on strike to protest unpaid wages in March and April 2015. Following corruption allegations and findings by the Russian Prosecutor General's Office that "a number of labor laws have been violated during the construction. [Putin is] taking personal control of the cosmodrome's construction".

In June 2015, the installation of support equipment and assembly of the first floor of the command post of the Vostochny Cosmodrome was handed over to specialists from the Centre for Operation of Space Ground-Based Infrastructure (TsENKI). In October 2015, it was announced that parts of the assembly complex for the Soyuz-2 rocket were designed for a different variant of the rocket and were too small, so the planned launch date of the first Soyuz-2 from Vostochny Cosmodrome in December 2015 was under review. A spokesperson for a Russian government space infrastructure agency reported that "work with the rocket at the integration and testing complex now can not be conducted because the facility is not ready", and added that "there are still imperfections in the construction". However, later this information was disproved by the cosmodrome's operation centre and the rocket was set into the facility.

The first launch of a Soyuz-2 rocket from Vostochny took place on 28 April 2016.

Construction 

Early plans projected that seven launch pads would be built at the site, including two for crewed flights. On 1 September 2009, Medvedev signed Presidential decree No. 562 designating Spetstroy as the cosmodrome's sole construction contractor. Construction began in January 2011 and was expected to be completed by 2018. Russian engineers looked to apply knowledge gained from building the Soyuz launch facilities in Kourou spaceport and the Angara pad at Naro Space Center in South Korea. As a cost-saving measure, no defensive military structures like those at Baikonur cosmodrome will be built at Vostochny.

In December 2011, ARMS-TASS reported with reference to the director of the Federal Special Construction Agency, Grigory Naginsky, that hotels and barracks were being constructed within the cosmodrome. Regarding housing plans, he noted that a town for 40 thousand people would be built near the cosmodrome.

In January 2012, a Russian Government Decree signed by Prime Minister Medvedev transferred  of forest lands in the Amur Oblast for construction of the spaceport from Shimanovsky and Svobodensky districts. On 2 March 2012, Deputy Prosecutor General Yuri Gulyagin said at a meeting with the Presidential representative in the Far Eastern Federal District Viktor Ishayev that timely payment of wages, as well as registration of vehicles and people involved in the construction of the cosmodrome, will soon be the focus of regulatory authorities. According to him, construction of the launch site should not be admitted to the violations that were in the construction of the 2012 APEC Summit projects. As noted at the meeting, the number of workers and organizations each month will only increase, and therefore requires strict control. The number of employees at the facility by the end of 2012 was projected to increase from 5,000 to 7,000.

In April 2013, Minister of Far Eastern Development Viktor Ishayev said that 2014 will be the busiest year in the construction period and the number of workers will rise to 7,000. He also said he was sorry for the delay in reconstructing and developing worker residence sites that were handed over by the Russian Ministry of Defense in Tsiolkovsky. On 12 April 2013, which is Cosmonautics Day in Russia, Putin suggested naming the town that will be built near the cosmodrome after the founder of theoretical astronautics Konstantin Tsiolkovsky, saying that there was not a single locality in Russia bearing the name of the scientist. Later it was decided to assign this name to Uglegorsk, the nearest city. In November 2013, the ITAR-TASS news agency reported that the three-month delay that existed in July was reduced by November to 10 days. By this time the first stage of the project, the construction of roads at the cosmodrome, had been completed. , more than 4,000 personnel, 680 pieces of construction equipment and vehicles were working at the site. With personnel working on a rotational basis, the overall number of people involved in the project had reached 5,246. In December 2013, specialists chose sites for Angara facilities at the cosmodrome and transported the mockup of a launch vehicle from Moscow-based Khrunichev Space Center to the spaceport.

In March 2014, Russia's federal network grid operator FGC UES completed the first phase of power supply to the cosmodrome. The first phase consists of a modernized "Ledyanaya" 220 kV substation which connects power receivers for complex structures to the Unified National Power Grid. In the same month, Spetstroy said it was hoping to finish building the launch pad for Soyuz-2 launch vehicles before the end of July 2015.

In July 2015, reconstruction of the Ledyanaya railway station was completed; it includes a garage, service and domestic building and treatment facilities, 20 new turnouts and communications systems. In the shortest possible time, an extension was built to the post of electric interlocking and high loading platform, in addition to the construction of railway stations Promishlennaya-1 and Promishlennaya-2. They are located within the territory of the cosmodrome. On 25 September 2015, the first rocket destined for a launch at Vostochny Cosmodrome arrived by train. The rocket, Soyuz-2.1a, was planned to launch in December 2015. The launch took place on 28 April 2016.

On 23 January 2019, Roscosmos cancelled the agreement with the troubled PSO Kazan company to build the launch pad for the Angara rocket in Vostochny. Russia's Prime Minister Dmitry Medvedev has harshly criticized Director General of Roscosmos Dmitry Rogozin and the top brass at the state space agency: "We should stop the project-mongering, quit blabbing about where we'll fly to in 2030, we should work, talk less and do more", Medvedev said.

Launches 

The first launch at the complex occurred on 28 April 2016, at 02:01 UTC, when a Soyuz-2 launched from pad Site 1S, carrying the gamma-ray astronomy satellite Mikhailo Lomonosov.

The second launch occurred on 28 November 2017, also from Site 1S, with a Soyuz-2.1b/Volga upper stage carrying Meteor-M No.2-1. The mission was declared a failure after telemetry was lost and the rocket re-entered the atmosphere due to the Fregat upper stage being programmed for a launch from Baikonur rather than the new Vostochny Cosmodrome.

The third launch occurred on 1 February 2018 from Site 1S, with a Soyuz 2.1a/Fregat-M. The primary payloads were two Russian government Earth observation satellites, Kanopus-V 3 and 4. Also aboard were 9 cubesats. The launch was successful. 

The fourth launch from Vostochny, using a Soyuz 2.1a, was conducted on 27 December 2018. The primary payloads were two Russian government Earth observation satellites, Kanopus-V 5 and 6. Also aboard were 26 small satellites that were deployed as secondary payloads. The launch of these small satellites was organized by GK Launch Services, a commercial subsidiary of Roscosmos.

The fifth launch took place on 5 July 2019. The Soyuz-2 rocket delivered weather satellite Meteor-M2-2 into orbit.

The sixth launch was conducted on 18 December 2020, with a Soyuz-2.1b/Fregat from Site 1S. The payload was 36 OneWeb Internet link satellites into low Earth orbit. The launch was successful.

The seventh–eleventh launches were conducted on 25 March, 26 April, 28 May, 1 July, and 10 October 2021, each with a Soyuz 2.1b/Fregat-M from Site 1S. Again, 36 × 5 OneWeb satellites were successfully launched into LEO.

Purpose 
The new cosmodrome will enable Russia to launch most missions from its own land, and reduce the dependency of Russia on the Baikonur Cosmodrome which is leased from the government of Kazakhstan. Currently, Baikonur is the only launch site operated by Russia with the capability to launch crewed missions to ISS or elsewhere. The Russian government pays a yearly rent of $115 million to Kazakhstan for its usage. Satellites bound for geostationary orbit and high inclination orbits can be currently launched from Plesetsk Cosmodrome in northwestern Russia. The new site is intended mostly for civilian launches. Roscosmos plans to move 45% of Russia's space launches to Vostochny by 2020, while the share from Baikonour will drop from 65% to 11%, and Plesetsk will account for 44%. In 2012, the share of space launches on Russian soil stood at 25%. By 2030, this figure is projected to increase to 90%.

Economic aspects 
Development of the Vostochny Cosmodrome is expected to have a positive impact on the economy of the relatively poorly developed Russian Far East. The Russian government has a strategic policy to bring high-tech companies into the Far East region, and several enterprises involved in human space flight are expected to move their activities there when the new cosmodrome is completed. Development of the new site is also expected to dramatically increase employment in the towns of Tsiolkovsky, Shimanovsk, Svobodny and others. According to a 2009 estimate, the construction will cost 400 billion rubles (US$13.5 billion). Along with the launch pads and processing facilities, an airport and a satellite city will be constructed. The city will be designed to accommodate 35,000 people as well as tourists. It will contain a full supporting infrastructure with schools, kindergartens and clinics. Architect Dmitry Pshenichnikov has stated that the city is to become a "one-of-its-kind scientific and tourist space town with a unique design and a beautiful landscape". When completed, the cosmodrome will permanently employ 20,000–25,000 people.

In November 2012, press reports indicated that the Russian government is having difficulty in finding a good use for the new spaceport, and that other government ministries have been avoiding the project, calling it a "dolgostroy", which is Russian for an "endless construction boondoggle".

Controversies 
Corruption severely set back construction of the Vostochny Cosmodrome. According to Russian prosecutors, at least US$165 million was embezzled during the construction process (critics claim that these numbers are severely downplayed), and in 2015, 350 workers painted giant messages on their barracks, asking Vladimir Putin to help after long payment delays. By July 2016, the price for the spaceport was US$7.5 billion with costs rising every year (for example, an additional US$105 million was requested in 2016).  By 2019, about 60 persons had been convicted for corruption.

Launch pads 
Seven launch pads are planned to be built at Vostochny over several years. Launch pads include:

 Site 1S ("S" for "Soyuz") – Soyuz-2, first launch on 28 April 2016, at 02:01 UTC.
 Site 1A ("A" for "Angara") – Angara-1.2/A5/A5P/A5V, construction began in September 2018, launches expected in 2023.
 PU 3 ("PU" or "ПУ" for "puskovaya ustanovka" or "пусковая установка", meaning "launch pad") – prospective super heavy-lift launch vehicle, launches beginning after 2023.

Gallery

References

External links 

 
 Map of area
 Vostokdrom

Spaceports
Soviet and Russian space program locations
Rocket launch sites in Russia
Buildings and structures in Amur Oblast
Transport infrastructure completed in 2016
2016 establishments in Russia